The purple-necked rock-wallaby (Petrogale purpureicollis) is a species of rock-wallaby first described in 1924 by Albert Sherbourne Le Souef, then director of the Taronga Zoo in Sydney, Australia, who noted a purple colouration around the neck and cranial features that distinguish it from other rock-wallaby species.

The purple colouration was thought by some sceptical scientists to be due to the animal rubbing against a dye, but the animal does in fact secrete a purple pigment. The pigment is known to wash off in the rain and fade away after death, causing some possible confusion with other rock-wallaby species.

The species has undergone taxonomic upheaval for decades and has variously been classified as an unadorned rock-wallaby, brush-tailed rock-wallaby, and black-flanked rock-wallaby. Le Souef and others have asserted that it was a new species, and this has been affirmed by a 2001 paper in the Australian Journal of Zoology.

References

External links
Entry into the Australian Journal of Zoology 
Short biography of Albert Sherbourne Le Souef
ABC article This page has an image.

Mammals of Queensland
Macropods
Marsupials of Australia
Mammals described in 1924